Eurema portoricensis, the Puerto Rican yellow, is a butterfly in the  family Pieridae. It is found in Puerto Rico.

The larvae feed on Senna obtusifolia, Senna alata, and Chamaecrista nictitans patellaria var. glabrata.

References

portoricensis
Butterflies described in 1877
Butterflies of the Caribbean
Taxa named by Hermann Dewitz